Lowdham is a village and civil parish in the Newark and Sherwood district of Nottinghamshire between Nottingham and Southwell. At the 2001 census it had a population of 2,832, increasing to 3,334 at the 2011 Census. Two main roads slicing through the village are the A6097 south-east to north-west and the A612 between Nottingham and Southwell.

History
This seems to be an Old English masculine personal nickname, Hluda,  + hām (Old English), village, a village community, a manor, an estate, a homestead., so"Hluda's  homestead or village". However, the name Lowdham points also to a Danish origin (earlier Ludham and Ludholme).

Relics of the Middle Ages remaining are an alabaster slab and a figure of a knight in armour, in the chancel of the church, inscribed to the memory of Sir John de Loudham. The dog at the feet of the effigy suggests that Loudham was a warrior. According to one source, "Many of the Crusaders are represented with their feet on a dog, to show that they followed the standard of the Lord as faithfully as a dog follows the footsteps of his master."

The old church and the castle mound are to the west of the bypass. St Mary's Church dates back to before the 14th century. In 1826 a Wesleyan Methodist Chapel (Top Chapel) was built in Ton Lane, and in 1844 an Independent Primitive Methodist Chapel (Bottom Chapel) appeared in the Main Street. The Ton Lane chapel closed in 1986. The Bottom Chapel continues in use as an Independent Methodist church.

To the north-east of the bypass is Lowdham Mill. There is now little sign of the frame knitting industry that was important in this area in the 19th century. In 1844 there were 94 stocking frames working in Lowdham.

Notable people
In birth order:
Sir John de Loudham (died 1318), landowner, is commemorated in St Mary's Church.
George Wilkins (1785–1865), Vicar of Lowdham (1815–1839), was later Vicar of St Mary's Church, Nottingham and Archdeacon of Nottingham, and prominent in church building and restoration in the city.
Cornelius Brown (1852–1907), local historian and newspaper editor, was born in Lowdham.
Harold Cottam (1891–1984), wireless operator aboard the RMS Carpathia, who received RMS Titanic's distress call and was instrumental in getting the Carpathia to come to her aid. He is honoured by a blue plaque on the wall of The Old Ship Inn.
Richard Whitehead (born 1976), Paralympic sprinter, is honoured by a gold-painted post box outside the post office.

Amenities
Lowdham railway station is on the Nottingham to Lincoln Line. Two miles from the railway station is HMP Lowdham Grange.

Village pubs are the Railway, the Magna Charta, the World's End (formally the Plough and still located in Plough Lane), and the Old Ship. All have open lounge/bar layouts and are situated near the centre of the village.

The retail services include two general stores, a sub-post office, several take-away eating places, a filling station and a bookshop.

Bus services

Nottingham City Transport
26: Nottingham – Carlton – Gedling – Burton Joyce – Lowdham
100: Nottingham – Carlton – Gedling – Burton Joyce – Lowdham – Southwell
AOT Coaches
5: Victoria Park – Netherfield – Stoke Bardolph – Burton Joyce – Lowdham – Epperstone – Woodborough – Calverton – Oxton

References

External links

 
Villages in Nottinghamshire
Civil parishes in Nottinghamshire
Newark and Sherwood